Shen Rong (born 1936) is a Chinese writer. Her name also appears as Chen Rong.

She was born Shen Derong in Hankou, Hubei. Because of the political unrest of the time, her family moved frequently, finally settling in Chongqing. She worked as an assistant at a publishing house and studied Russian in Beijing. She then worked as a translator at a radio station but was released in 1963 due to illness. In 1973, she went to live with a peasant family in Shanxi.

She began writing in the 1970s, producing the novel The Eternal Spring (Yongyuan shi chuntian). Her story At Middle Age (Ren dao zhongnian) (1980) won a literary award and was made into a movie, catapulting her into the spotlight. In 1991, she published At Old Age (Rendao Iaonian).

In 1983, she wrote the essay Novels strangled in the cradle:  My Senseless Literary Battles, which described her difficulties as a writer living through radical shifts in her society's ideology.

References 

1936 births
Living people
People's Republic of China novelists
Chinese women novelists
20th-century women writers
International Writing Program alumni
Chinese women short story writers
20th-century Chinese short story writers
People's Republic of China short story writers
Short story writers from Hubei
Writers from Wuhan